Darling is a 2007 Indian Hindi-language horror romantic drama film released on 7 September 2007. The film, which stars Esha Deol, Fardeen Khan and Isha Koppikar in the lead roles, was directed by Ram Gopal Varma. It was shot in Mumbai, India. The soundtrack was composed by Himesh Reshammiya and Pritam. The film was average grosser grossed Rs. 22 million in the first week.

Synopsis 
Aditya is married to a traditional wife, Ashwini, and has a young boy. But he is having an affair with his secretary, Geeta Menon who has a wild personality. He manages to balance the women with clever lies. He promises Geeta he will marry her, after divorcing Ashwini. He seems to display fetish behaviours with the two women.

On one of their romantic excursions, Aditya takes Geeta to his friend's bungalow at Madh Island. All seems fine until Geeta shocks Aditya with news that she is pregnant. Worried, he insists that they cannot have a child together and suggests an abortion. This attitude enrages Geeta and they engage in a fight in which he pushes her. She accidentally hits her head against a hard object, the force of which kills her instantly. He disposes of her body and returns home, behaving as if everything is normal.

His former lover returns as a vengeful ghost who will stop at nothing till she gets her revenge. She appears often to frighten Aditya. Ashwini notices her husband's fear of a ghost whom she cannot see. To relieve his guilt, Aditya admits his affair with Geeta and her death to Ashwini. His wife's reaction is to leave but she is then admitted to hospital due to a major accident. Geeta returns to the frame and gives her forgiveness to Aditya. Ashwini recovers but Geeta's revengeful soul has transferred into her body.

Cast 
 Fardeen Khan as Aditya "Adit" Soman
 Esha Deol as Geeta Menon 
 Zakir Hussain as Sameer Naghani, Aditya's friend
 Isha Koppikar as Ashwini A. Soman
 Upendra Limaye as Inspector Bhaskar Reddy
 Kota Srinivasa Rao as Psychiatrist
 Nisha Kothari in a special appearance in the song "Aa Khushi Se Khudkushi"
 Shishir Sharma as Anjan Menon, Geeta's father
 Kiku Sharda as Doctor
 Rasika Joshi as Mrs. Shah Rukh Khan, psychiatric patient

Music 

The soundtrack was released on 1 August 2007 in many formats including music cassette, MP3 files, audio CD, and DVD-Audio. The music was composed by Pritam and Himesh Reshammiya in a guest song. The first reviews of the soundtrack have been positive with indiafm.com rating the music at 3.5 out of 5. Joginder Tuteja of indiafm.com said "Darling is a good album that thoroughly entertains while it is on." SmasHits.com said "Darling is the biggest musical bonanza from Ramu's factory after series of miserable musical releases from bunch of his reliable protégés in last few years."

On 10 September 2007 the film was at number 5 on the charts.

The song "Aa Khushi Se Khudkushi" from this film is a cover of Namie Amuro's song "Want Me, Want Me", which was released on 6 April 2005.

References

External links

 Official movie site

2007 horror films
2000s romantic thriller films
Indian romantic thriller films
2000s Hindi-language films
Indian avant-garde and experimental films
2000s horror thriller films
Indian horror thriller films
Films directed by Ram Gopal Varma
2007 films
Hindi films remade in other languages
Films scored by Himesh Reshammiya
Films featuring songs by Pritam
Indian romantic horror films
2000s avant-garde and experimental films